Luxor Evolved is a tile-matching video game released in 2012 by MumboJumbo.

Gameplay
The objective of Luxor Evolved is similar to other marble-popping matching games such as  PopCap Games's Zuma. Typical of the Luxor series, each stage includes a series of scarabs pushing a line of marbles along a path toward an open pyramid. The player must rescue the marbles, using a marble-launching "winged scarab" which moves across the bottom of the screen, by matching a chain of three or more of the same color marbles, or by using various power-ups, which are dispensed randomly when the marbles are rescued. If any marble completely enters the holes, the player loses a life.

Luxor Evolved introduces gameplay and style changes which are different from what has been expected. Compared to earlier games, the gameplay moves much faster. The chains of marbles are reversed, leaving some behind, when the player loses a life the stage doesn’t reset; on a survival stage, instead losing a life terminates the stage right away. Power-ups are unlocked and upgraded by earning a minimum high score or sometimes by beating a boss. There are also "super power-ups" which are unlocked by beating the first, third, and sixth bosses. Upon unlocking a super power-up, emblems periodically appear and by filling up a meter corresponding to that power-up activates the power up automatically. A super power-up can also be activated by shooting 6 shards which opens a gap out of the spheres.

The graphics of Evolved are reminiscent of the vector graphics commonly used in video games of the late 70s and early 80s.

Luxor Evolved includes multiple different types of stages: classic, survival, bonus, secret, and boss. Many levels from previous Luxor games but are instead mirrored or rearranged. If the player outlasts the timer on a survival stage, they are rewarded with a bonus stage where they must clear all the marbles using a certain power-up, these are not special stages; those are different. The player is faced with a boss stage when they complete a group of stages, the boss that they must destroy being a giant robot named after an ancient Egyptian god, such as "Mecha-Sekhmet" or "Mecha-Horus". During stages if the player collects enough falling treasures, they will immediately unlock a secret stage which they can beat along with the normal stages. The player is informed on the amount of gold to collect in between stages. The spheres are shaped as octagons, with shapes inside the octagons being: a blue 5-shaped star, a red hexagon, a green square, a yellow triangle, a purple triangle, a white 4-shaped star, a black star (shown as pink in-game), a turquoise plus, or an orange plus.

Evolved features references to numerous video game tropes of its time. All of the secret stages pay homage to classic arcade games such as Asteroids and Pac-Man. The pause menu features a Qix that flies across the menu screen. The game's ending sequence is a simulation of a kill screen and error handler, "rebooting" into a playable credit roll thereafter and acting as a final bonus stage that awards points for successful completion. From there a tally of the player's total game stats are shown such as total shots, misses, max chains, and treasures recovered.

References 

2012 video games
IOS games
Tile-matching video games
MumboJumbo games
Video games based on Egyptian mythology
Video games developed in the United States
Video games set in Egypt
Windows games